Nadezhda Ivanova (born 3 August 1990) is a retired Russian artistic gymnast. 

As a junior, she won the gold medal in the junior team event at the 2004 European Women's Artistic Gymnastics Championships. Two years later, she won the bronze medal in the team event at the 2006  European Women's Artistic Gymnastics Championships.

References

1990 births
Living people
Russian female artistic gymnasts
Place of birth missing (living people)
21st-century Russian women